Wayne Brown (1959–1991) was a speedway rider from New Zealand.

Speedway career 
Brown rode in the top two tiers of British Speedway from 1976 to 1982, riding for various clubs. In 1980, he became the National League Riders' Champion.

on 29 January 1991, Brown died in an industrial accident in his native New Zealand.

References 

1959 births
1991 deaths
British speedway riders
Berwick Bandits riders
Sheffield Tigers riders
Wolverhampton Wolves riders
Sportspeople from Wellington City